Africanus Fabius Maximus was a Roman senator. His elder brother was Paullus Fabius Maximus (consul 11 BCE) and his sister was Fabia Paullina, who married Marcus Titius.

It is believed that Africanus was named in honour of his famous family ancestor Scipio Africanus Aemilianus.

Career 

The career of Africanus Fabius Maximus is much less clear than that of his brother. It is believed that Africanus' earliest post was as a military tribune in Spain, though this is not certain. His only two certain civilian posts were as ordinary consul in 10 BCE (with Iullus Antonius), and as proconsul of Africa in 6/5 BCE. He was admitted to the priesthood of the septemviri epulonum at some point after 25 BCE.

It was during his tenure as proconsul of Africa that Africanus struck some coins that bore his own image.

Possible family 

Although no wife is attested for Africanus, it is possible that he had a daughter named Fabia Numantina. Alternatively, she may have been the daughter of Africanus' brother, Paullus Fabius Maximus and his wife, Marcia.

See also
 Fabia gens

Footnotes

References 
 Ronald Syme, The Augustan Aristocracy (Oxford University Press, 1989). , 

Africanus
40s BC births
1st-century BC Roman consuls
Roman governors of Africa
Epulones of the Roman Empire
Year of birth uncertain
Year of death unknown